Garan the Eternal is a collection of science fiction short fiction by American writer Andre Norton.  It was first published in a hardcover edition of 1,300 copies by Fantasy Publishing Company, Inc. in December 1972. The first paperback edition was issued by DAW Books in March 1973, and was reprinted in July 1975, December 1978, June 1985, and September 1987.]

The book collects four short stories, novelettes and novellas by Norton, including the "Witch World" story "Legacy from Sorn-Fen." The book marks the first complete publication of "Garan of Yu-Lac," as the magazine in which it was originally serialized folded before the third and final part could be published.

Contents
 Introduction
 "Garin of Tav" (alternate title, "People of the Crater", in some editions) (from Fantasy Book v. 1 no. 1, July 1947)
 "Garan of Yu-Lac" (from Spaceway, v. 4, no. 3-v. 5, no. 1, September–October 1969, May–June 1970)
 "Legacy from Sorn-Fen" (original to the collection)
 "One Spell Wizard" (original to the collection)

Publication history
1973, US, DAW Books 45 , Pub date March 1973, Paperback

Notes

Sources

1972 short story collections
Science fiction short story collections
Short story collections by Andre Norton
Fantasy Publishing Company, Inc. books